Alec Rayme (born December 20, 1978) is an American actor.

Rayme has several film and television credits to his name.

Filmography

Film

Television

References

American male film actors
1978 births
Living people
Male actors from Akron, Ohio